Thomas Dickie (October 24, 1860 – December 16, 1935) was a journalist, lawyer and political figure in Manitoba. He represented Avondale from 1896 to 1899 in the Legislative Assembly of Manitoba as a Liberal.

He was born at Puslinch Lake, Wellington County, Canada West, the son of James Dickie, a native of Scotland, and Elizabeth Stewart. Dickie was educated locally, in Guelph and in St. Catharines. He was a publisher and editor and also served as a justice of the peace. In 1892, Dickie married Sarah J. Griffiths, a widow. He trained as a lawyer and, after leaving politics, practised law in Winnipeg. Around 1911, Dickie moved to Vancouver, British Columbia.

He died in Vancouver at the age of 75.

References 

1860 births
1935 deaths
Manitoba Liberal Party MLAs